Shane McGovern (born 1992) is an Irish hurler who played as a goalkeeper with the Westmeath senior team.

Born in Crookedwood, County Westmeath, McGovern first played competitive hurling during his schooling at Coláiste Mhuire in Mullingar. He arrived on the inter-county scene at the age of nineteen when he first linked up with the Westmeath under-21 team. McGovern made his senior debut during the 2012 championship.

At club level McGovern plays with Crookedwood.

References

1992 births
Living people
Westmeath inter-county hurlers
Hurling goalkeepers
Crookedwood hurlers